Events from the year 1907 in France.

Incumbents
President: Armand Fallières 
President of the Council of Ministers: Georges Clemenceau

Events
 2 January – Latest Anti-clericalism laws comes into force, which forbids crucifixes in schools
 11 February – The French cruiser Jean Bart sinks off the coast of Morocco.
 March – ESSEC Business School is founded.
 12 March – The French battleship Iéna blows up at Toulon; 120 lives lost.
 6 April – Louis Blériot flies his new monoplane ten yards.
 10 April – French doctors announce the discovery of a new serum to cure dysentery.
 18 April – Georges Clemenceau orders dismissal of striking civil servants; army mobilised for fear of May Day unrest.
 17 May – Several thousand riot during the revolt of the Languedoc winegrowers at Béziers in the south of France.
 9 June – Aviator Alberto Santos-Dumont's combined aeroplane and airship is wrecked in its first trial
 28 June – Georges Clemenceau wins a majority in the Chamber of Deputies.
 12 July – Major Alfred Dreyfus resigns from the army, one year after his rehabilitation.
 14 July – President Armand Fallières narrowly escapes an assassination attempt.
 10 August – Peking to Paris motor race concludes.
 18 December – Louis Blériot's demonstrations of his new aeroplane at Issy end in its destruction.

Sport
8 July – Tour de France begins.
4 August – Tour de France ends, won by Lucien Petit-Breton.

Births

January to March
8 January – Jean Hyppolite, philosopher (died 1968)
11 January – Pierre Mendès France, politician and Prime Minister of France (died 1982)
24 January – Maurice Couve de Murville, politician and Prime Minister (died 1999)
5 February – Pierre Pflimlin, politician and Prime Minister (died 2000)
15 February
Célestin Delmer, international soccer player (died 1996)
Jean Langlais, composer and organist (died 1991)
22 March – Roger Blin, comedian and actor (died 1984)

April to June
7 April – Violette Leduc, author (died 1972)
10 April – Marcel Simon, historian (died 1986)
12 April – Eugène Chaboud, motor racing driver (died 1983)
15 April – Jean Fourastié, economist (died 1990)
28 April – Henri Michel, historian (died 1986)
29 April – Tino Rossi, singer and actor (died 1983)
22 May – Jean Beaufret, philosopher and Germanist (died 1982)
23 May – Ginette Mathiot, food writer (died 1998)
26 May – Jean Bernard, physician and haematologist (died 2006)
30 May – Germaine Tillion, anthropologist (died 2008)
12 June – Émile Veinante, soccer player and coach (died 1983)
14 June – René Char, poet (died 1988)
17 June – Maurice Cloche, film director, screenwriter and film producer (died 1990)

July to September
7 July – Louis-Jean Guyot, Cardinal (died 1988)
5 August – Eugène Guillevic, poet (died 1997)
7 September – Roland Mousnier, historian (died 1993)
22 September – Maurice Blanchot, writer, philosopher, and literary theorist (died 2003)
23 September – Anne Desclos, journalist and novelist (died 1998)

October to December
1 October – Maurice Bardèche, essayist, literary and art critic, journalist and Neo-Fascist (died 1998)
4 October – Alain Daniélou, historian, musicologist and Indologist (died 1994)
5 October – Jean Louis, costume designer (died 1997)
8 October – Pierre Bertaux, Germanist (died 1986)
9 October – Jacques Tati, comedic filmmaker (died 1982)
13 October – Yves Allégret, film director (died 1987)
16 October – Roger Vailland, novelist, essayist, and screenwriter (died 1965)
17 October – Marcel Barbu, politician (died 1984)
29 October – Edwige Feuillère, actress (died 1998)
1 November
Paul Bacon, politician (died 1999)
Edmond Delfour, international soccer player, manager (died 1990)
3 November – Raymond Bussières, actor (died 1982)
6 November – Raymond Savignac, graphic artist (died 2002)
18 November – Pierre Dreyfus, civil servant and businessman (died 1994)
19 November – Fernand Cornez, cyclist (died 1997)
20 November – Henri-Georges Clouzot, film director, screenwriter and producer (died 1977)
30 November – Jacques Barzun, historian (died 2012)
10 December
Daniel Barbier, astronomer (died 1965)
Lucien Laurent, international soccer player, scored the first ever World Cup goal (died 2005)
16 December – Jacques Pâris de Bollardière, General (died 1986)
24 December – André Cailleux, paleontologist and geologist (died 1986)

Deaths
20 January – Louis Émile Javal, ophthalmologist (born 1839)
25 January – René Pottier, cyclist, winner of 1906 Tour de France (born 1879)
16 February – Princess Clémentine of Orléans, youngest daughter of Louis-Philippe, King of the French (born 1817)
20 February – Henri Moissan, chemist, Nobel Prize laureate (born 1852)
21 February – Jacques-Marie-Louis Monsabré, priest and orator (born 1827)
11 March – Jean Casimir-Perier, politician, fifth president of the French Third Republic (born 1847)
18 March – Marcellin Berthelot, chemist and politician (born 1827)
12 May – Joris-Karl Huysmans, novelist (born 1848)
13 July – Jacques-Joseph Grancher, pediatrician (born 1843)
16 July – Théobald Chartran, painter (born 1849)
6 September – Sully Prudhomme, poet and essayist, winner of first Nobel Prize in Literature in 1901 (born 1839)
21 September – Pierre Adolphe Adrien Doyon, dermatologist (born 1827)
1 November – Alfred Jarry, playwright and novelist (born 1873)

See also
 List of French films before 1910

References

1900s in France